Eisenberg an der Raab is a small village in Burgenland, Austria and a part of the municipality of Sankt Martin an der Raab, near the Slovenian and Hungarian borders.

Cities and towns in Jennersdorf District